Jovan Vasić (Serbian Cyrillic: Јован Bacић; born 20 January 1987) is a Serbian footballer, who currently plays for BSK Borča in the Serbian SuperLiga. He made SuperLiga debut on 13 August 2011, the first matchday of the 2011–12 season, against FK Smederevo.

References

1987 births
Living people
Serbian footballers
FK BSK Borča players
Footballers from Belgrade
Association football midfielders